Gokulam Kerala Football Club is an Indian professional football club based in Calicut, Kerala. Founded in 2017, the club competes in the I-League, the second tier of Indian football league system. They won the 2020–21 I-League to become the first ever club from Kerala to win an I-League title, and became the first ever team to defend the I-League title in 2021–22 season. Gokulam is also the first club from Kerala to qualify for a continental competition, the AFC Cup.

Nicknamed Malabarians, Gokulam Kerala represents the state of Kerala, predominantly its Malabar region. Affiliated with Kerala Football Association (KFA), the club also competes in Kerala Premier League, and clinched titles in 2017–18, and 2020–21.

History

Formation and early years (2017–2020)
Gokulam Kerala was founded in January 2017. On 20 September, after the second round of bidding invitations, the bid evaluation committee decided to award Sree Gokulam Group the right to field their team in the Hero I-League 2017–18 season onwards from Calicut, Kerala. Although the club did not have a good beginning, they went on to defeat clubs like East Bengal, Mohun Bagan and Minerva Punjab by the end of the season. Gokulam Kerala hired Spaniard Fernando Santiago Varela as head coach in March 2018.

On 15 March 2018, Gokulam played the Super Cup qualifiers against North East United FC and was qualified with a 2-goal victory. In the pre-quarterfinals of the Super Cup on 1 April 2018, they were leading against Bengaluru FC by 0–1 until 60 minutes with a goal scored by the striker Henry Kisekka but Bengaluru scored a stoppage time goal which led to a defeat of 2–1.

Gokulam in 2019, for the first time went abroad and participated at the 2019 Sheikh Kamal International Club Cup in Bangladesh, where they qualified for the Semi-finals after finishing 2nd in Group B. Gokulam finished as semifinalist after losing 3–2 to Chittagong Abahani. Gokulam Kerala won their maiden title under the coaching of Fernando Santiago Varela, the 129th edition of the Durand Cup on 24 August 2019, defeating Mohun Bagan AC 2–1 in Kolkata.

2020–present
Gokulam Kerala won the 2020–21 I-League by defeating TRAU FC in the final game. With 29 points from 15 games, they qualified for the 2022 AFC Cup group stage.

In April 2021, Gokulam Kerala emerged as the champions of the 2020–21 Kerala Premier League, defeating KSEB FC 2–1 at the Thrissur Municipal Corporation Stadium. They began their 2021–22 I-League season on 26 December with 1–0 win against Churchill Brothers. They later thrashed Real Kashmir by 5–1.

After back to back wins in both the group and championship stages, the club clinched I-League title again in 2021–22 season, defeating Mohammedan Sporting 2–1 in the final game at the Salt Lake Stadium on 14 May, and became the first club in fifteen years to defend a national league title.

At the 2022 AFC Cup group-stage opener, the club achieved a historic 4–2 win against Indian Super League side ATK Mohun Bagan. Later, they were defeated 1–0 by Maldivian side Maziya S&RC, 1–2 by Bangladeshi side Bashundhara Kings respectively, and knocked out of the tournament. On July 5, the club officially announced that they roped in former Cameroonian international Richard Towa as new head coach. Due to not maintaining good form in league marches, the club parted ways with Towa and roped in Spanish manager in place of him.

Stadium

Gokulam Kerala FC plays all its home matches at the EMS Stadium, which is located in the heart of Calicut city. West stand is the largest block and can accommodate most spectators. Capacity of the stadium is limited to 80,000.

Gokulam Kerala previously played in Malappuram District Sports Complex Stadium for the matches of Kerala Premier League. They also used Kottappadi Stadium in Malappuram for training purposes.

Supporters
Kerala is a state known for its passionate football fans. Football in Northern Kerala (known as Malabar Coastal Region) has arguably one of the most passionate fanbase in the state. "GKFC Battalia" is one of the largest supporters' group of Gokulam Kerala FC.

Rivalry

Rivalry with Kolkata clubs

Gokulam Kerala is known for pathbreaking the Kolkata clubs, Mohun Bagan, East Bengal and Mohammedan in some major matches in I-League and Durand Cup. Gokulam Kerala won the 2019 Durand Cup by defeating East Bengal in the semi-final and Mohun Bagan in the final. They also defeated Mohammedan in the deciding last match of 2021–22 I-League to clinch their consecutive league title. Both the states, Kerala and West Bengal, are two dominant powerhouses of Indian Football.

Rivalry with Kerala United FC 
Gokulam Kerala enjoys an on-field rivalry with another Kozhikode based side Kerala United FC (previously Quartz Calicut). The first match between the two teams took place in the group stage of 2017–18 Kerala Premier League, where Quartz Calicut were winners.

After the purchase of Kerala united FC by the owners of Sheffield United, the first match took place in 2020–21 Kerala Premier League semifinal. The match ended goaless and Gokulam won 4–2 on penalties.

Results

Crest, colours & kits

Crest

The club crest incorporates elements from historical Theyyam, a famous ritual art form that originated in northern Kerala. It encompasses dance, mime and music. The crest was unveiled in January 2017, by chief minister Pinarayi Vijayan and football legend I. M. Vijayan.

Colours
During the early days they used yellow and red coloured home kit. From 2018–19 season onwards, maroon was used as primary colour for home kit.

Kit evolution

Kit manufacturers and shirt sponsors

Players

First-team squad

Gokulam Kerala FC Reserves

Honours

League
 I-League
Champions (2): 2020–21, 2021–22
 Kerala Premier League
Champions (2): 2017–18, 2020–21
Runners-up (3): 2018–19, 2019–20, 2022–23
Kerala State Club Championship
Runners-up (1): 2016–17

Cup

 Durand Cup
Champions (1): 2019

Invitational
 Sheikh Kamal International Club Cup
Semi-finals (1): 2019

Reserve team
 Bodousa Cup
Champions (1): 2019
 Independence Day Cup
Champions (1): 2019
Mayors Cup
Runners-up (1): 2019

Women's team

Indian Women's League
Champions (2): 2020, 2021–22
 AFC Women's Club Championship
 Third place (1): 2021

Technical staff

Current technical staff

Notable players

The following Gokulam Kerala players have been capped at full international level. Years in brackets indicate their spells at the club.

Managerial history

Head coach's record

Season analysis

Statistics and records

Most appearances

Club captains

Top scorers

Performance in AFC competitions

 AFC Cup: 1 appearance
2022: Group Stage

AFC Club Ranking

Affiliated club(s)
The following club is currently affiliated with Gokulam Kerala FC:
Viva Chennai FC (2018–present)
Aspire FC (2022–present)

See also
 List of football clubs in Kerala
 Football in Kerala

References

External links

Official
Gokulam Kerala FC (official website)

Others
 Gokulam Kerala FC at Soccerway
 Gokulam Kerala FC at GSA
Gokulam Kerala FC at ESPN
Gokulam Kerala FC at Eleven Sports
 Gokulam Kerala FC at WorldFootball.net
Gokulam Kerala FC at the-AIFF.com

 
I-League clubs
Football clubs in Kerala
Association football clubs established in 2017
2017 establishments in Kerala